Sudden Attack (Korean: 서든어택) is a free-to-play multiplayer first-person shooter online game developed by the South Korean company GameHi. On December 2, 2013, Nexon America CEO Min Kim announced plans to discontinue Sudden Attack North American service. Nexon America terminated Sudden Attack on January 29, 2014. A sequel, Sudden Attack 2 was launched in 2016.

Gameplay

There are two teams in the game, red and blue. The red team is the Tanzirilo Independence Force, and the blue team is the United Great Force. There are various types of game play matches in different maps. Deathmatch, Destruction, capture the flag, or custom modes (sniper only, pistol only, or knife only). Both teams must satisfy certain conditions, such as defusing a bomb, successful planting and detonation, or achieving a certain number of kills.

There are two types of currencies: Cash and Points. Cash is based on real money and can be charged in exchange for a monetary payment, cell phone billing, or home phone billing and by bank transfer. Points can be earned from playing games. Points and cash can be spent at the in-game shop. Points are used for buying weapons. Cash enables the purchase of in-game boosts (i.e. +50% points) and special bonus items, along with special team-specific outfits. Cash and points can also be earned through participation in promotions.

In July 2018, a new event currency SP was added, which stands for Sudden Point, and is a new commodity needed to purchase items at SP stores or flea markets. SP can be obtained through various events in the game.

Development
On September 30, 2011, Sudden Attack'''s Taiwanese publisher, Gamon, announced it would not renew its contract with Nexon to operate the game in Taiwan.  A Few months later, Gamania, which had published many of Nexon's games including Counter-Strike Online, obtained the rights.  The game was renamed "S.A. STORM''".  The game's closed beta started on February 22, 2012 and became fully operational on April 18, 2012.

References

External links
 Official site for South Korea 
 Sudden Attack 2 Official site for South Korea 

2005 video games
Products and services discontinued in 2014
Inactive multiplayer online games
Video games developed in South Korea
Windows games
Windows-only games
First-person shooters
LithTech games
Netmarble games